EPIC 204278916 is a pre-main-sequence star, about five million years old with a spectral type of M1, implying a red dwarf. It is part of the Upper Scorpius sub-group of the Scorpius–Centaurus association, and is in the constellation Scorpius.

This stellar object was first characterized by the 2nd USNO CCD Astrograph Catalog and the Two Micron All-Sky Survey, and was further studied during the Kepler space telescope's extended K2 mission Campaign 2 between 23 August and 13 November 2014.

Luminosity
In August 2016, a team of astronomers, led by Simone Scaringi of the Max Planck Institute for Extraterrestrial Physics in Germany, reported that this red dwarf star has a resolved circumstellar disc. Further, the research team observed unusual luminosity dimmings of up to 65% for 25 consecutive days (out of 79 total observation days). The variability in luminosity was highly periodic and attributed to stellar rotation. The researchers hypothesized that the irregular dimmings were caused by either a warped inner-disk edge or transiting cometary-like objects in either circular or eccentric orbits.

See also
 Disrupted planet
 List of stars that have unusual dimming periods

References

External links
 EPIC Catalog at MAST

Astronomical objects discovered in 2016
Scorpius (constellation)
M-type main-sequence stars
Pre-main-sequence stars
J16020757-2257467
Upper Scorpius